Yuriko Yamamuro Renardy is a Japanese–American expert in fluid dynamics who works as a Class Of 1950 Endowed Professor of Mathematics at Virginia Tech.

Education and career
Renardy earned a bachelor's degree from the Australian National University in 1977, and a doctorate in 1981 from the University of Western Australia. Her dissertation, supervised by John J. Mahony, was entitled Water Waves above a Sill.

She worked as a lecturer, researcher, and project coordinator at the University of Wisconsin–Madison and University of Minnesota before joining the Virginia Tech faculty as an assistant professor in 1986. She became the Class Of 1950 Professor in 2000.

Recognition
Renardy was named a Fellow of the American Physical Society in 1997 "for her seminal contributions to the fluid dynamics of interfacial instabilities, through the mathematical analysis of viscous, viscoelastic and thermal effects". She became a fellow of the Institute of Mathematics and its Applications in 2011, and of the Society for Industrial and Applied Mathematics in 2014.

References

External links
Home page

Year of birth missing (living people)
Living people
Australian women mathematicians
20th-century Australian mathematicians
21st-century Australian mathematicians
American women mathematicians
20th-century American mathematicians
21st-century American mathematicians
Australian National University alumni
Virginia Tech faculty
University of Minnesota faculty
University of Wisconsin–Madison faculty
Fellows of the American Physical Society
Fellows of the Society for Industrial and Applied Mathematics
20th-century women mathematicians
21st-century women mathematicians
20th-century American women
21st-century American women
20th-century Australian women